The 2011 NCAA Division 1 softball tournament was held from May 19 through June 8, 2011 as part of the 2011 NCAA Division 1 softball season. The 64 NCAA Division 1 college softball teams were selected out of an eligible 284 teams on May 15, 2011. 30 teams were awarded an automatic bid as champions of their conference, and 34 teams were selected at-large by the NCAA Division 1 Softball Selection Committee. The tournament culminated with eight teams playing in the 2011 Women's College World Series at ASA Hall of Fame Stadium in Oklahoma City, Oklahoma.

Automatic bids

National seeds
Teams in "italics" advanced to super regionals.
Teams in "bold" advanced to Women's College World Series.

Arizona State
Alabama

Florida

Regionals and super regionals

Tempe Super Regional

Tucson Super Regional

Columbia Super Regional

Gainesville Super Regional

Stillwater Super Regional

Athens Super Regional

Berkeley Super Regional

Tuscaloosa Super Regional

Women's College World Series

Participants

† Excludes results of the pre-NCAA Women's College World Series of 1969 through 1981.

Notes
 Oklahoma and Oklahoma State both advanced to the Women's College World Series, held in Oklahoma, for the first time ever.

Bracket and results

Bracket
All times are Central Time Zone

Game results

Championship game

Final standings

All-Tournament Team
 Whitney Larsen, Alabama
 Holly Holl, Baylor
 Whitney Canion, Baylor
 Chelsea Thomas, Missouri
 Cheyenne Coyle, Florida
 Kelsey Bruder, Florida
 Brittany Schutte, Florida
 Krista Donnenwirth, Arizona State
 Annie Lockwood, Arizona State
 Mandy Urfer, Arizona State

WCWS records
 Runs, game (team), 16 - tied with UCLA (3 June 2010)
In Game 11, Florida scored 16 runs against Alabama
 Runs, inning (team), 11 - new record, surpassing former record of 9 (UCLA, 24 May 1992)
In Game 11, Florida scored 11 runs in the first inning of a 16-2 victory over Alabama
 Runs, Series (team), 45 - new record, surpassing former record of 31 (UCLA in 1992)
In Game 11, Florida scored its 32nd run of the Series in a 16-2 victory over Alabama
 RBI, game (team), 15 - new record, surpassing former record of 11 (Arizona, 25 May 1989; Arizona State, 3 June 2008)
In Game 11, Florida batted in 15 runs in 16-2 victory over Alabama
 Margin of victory, 14 runs - tied with Alabama (30 May 2009)
In Game 11, Florida defeated Alabama 16-2
 Home runs, game (team), 4 - tied with Georgia (30 May 2009) and UCLA (8 June 2010)
In Game 11, Michelle Moultrie, Brittany Schutte, Ensley Gammel, and Cheyenne Coyle hit home runs for the Florida Gators
In Game 14, Sam Parlich and Annie Lockwood hit home runs and Krista Donnenwirth hit two home runs for the Arizona State Sun Devils
 Runs, Series (individual), 10 - new record, surpassing former record of 8 (Caitlin Lowe in 2006)
In Game 13, Kelsey Bruder scored her 7th, 8th, and 9th runs of the Series in Florida's 9-2 victory over Alabama
 Home runs, game (individual), 2 - tied with Gutierrez (UCLA, 1992), Collins (Arizona, 1999), Enea (Florida, 2008), Harrison (UCLA, 2010), Schutte (Florida, 2010), Langenfeld (UCLA, 2010), & Chambers (Arizona, 2010)
In Game 14, Krista Donnenwirth hit two home runs in Arizona State's 14-4 win over Florida
 Home runs, Series (individual), 4 - tied with Megan Langenfeld, Andrea Harrison, and Stacie Chambers (2010)
Michelle Moultrie hit home runs in Game 4, Game 6, Game 11, and Game 14
 Home runs, Series (team), 14 by Florida - tied with UCLA (2010)
In Game 14, Michelle Moultrie hit Florida's 14th home run of the Series
 Home runs (total), 7 - tied with UCLA & Arizona (8 June 2010)
In Game 14, Arizona State hit four home runs and Florida hit three
 Total bases, game (individual), 8 - tied
In Game 14, Krista Donnenwirth went 2-for-4 with two home runs
 Total bases, game (team), 26 - new record, surpassing former record of 20 (UCLA, 24 May 1992; Arizona, 26 May 1996; Northwestern, 1 June 2006)
In Game 14, Arizona State collected eight singles, a double, and four home runs
 Total bases, game (both teams), 41 - new record
In Game 14, Florida collected one single, one double, and three home runs in addition to Arizona State's 26 total bases
 Hits, Series (individual), 13 - tied
In Game 15, Michelle Moultrie collected her 13th hit with a leadoff double
 Total bases, Series (individual), 26 - new record
In Game 15, Michelle Moultrie collected her 25th and 26th bases with a leadoff double
 Fewest errors, Tournament (team), 0 - tied with UCLA (1988 and 1982)
The Arizona State Sun Devils completed the Tournament without making an error in the field

Note: The above records exclude those of the pre-NCAA Women's College World Series of 1969 through 1981.

Post-series notes
Dallas Escobedo and Michelle Moultrie won co-MVP honors.  Moultrie batted .542, going 13-for-24 with four home runs and seven RBI; Escobedo pitched 35 innings, surrendering 12 earned runs on 27 hits and 19 walks while striking out 38 to become the fourth freshman to win the WCWS in the NCAA era and the first since 1990.

External links
http://www.ncaa.com/brackets/softball/d1/2011
http://www.ncaa.com/sports/ncaa-w-softbl-body.html

References

NCAA Division I softball tournament
Tournament